The 1997 BC Lions finished in fourth place in the West Division with an 8–10 record. Because of the "crossover" rule, they appeared in the East Semi-Final. The Lions became the first West Division team to appear in the East Division playoffs, but lost to the Montreal Alouettes.

Offseason

CFL Draft

Ottawa Rough Riders Dispersal Draft

Preseason

Regular season

Season standings

Season schedule

Awards and records
CFL's Most Outstanding Canadian Award – Sean Millington (FB)

1997 CFL All-Stars
WR – Alfred Jackson, CFL All-Star
LB – Maurice Kelley, CFL All-Star

1997 Intergold CFLPA All-Stars
FB – Sean Millington, Intergold CFLPA All-Star
WR – Alfred Jackson, Intergold CFLPA All-Star
HC – Adam Rita, Intergold CFLPA All-Star

Playoffs

East Semi-Final

References

BC Lions seasons
BC Lions
1997 in British Columbia